This page provides supplementary chemical data on bromine trifluoride.

Material Safety Data Sheet  

The handling of this chemical may require substantial safety precautions. It is highly recommended you obtain the Material Safety Datasheet (MSDS) for this chemical from a reliable source  such as AirGas, and follow its directions.

Structure and properties

Thermodynamic properties

Spectral data

References 

Chemical data pages
Chemical data pages cleanup